The 1998 NCAA Division I women's volleyball tournament began on December 3, 1998, with 64 teams and ended December 19 when Long Beach State defeated Penn State 3 games to 2 in Madison, Wisconsin, for the program's third NCAA title and fifth national title overall.

Long Beach State became the first team in NCAA history to finish the season undefeated. Penn State, who was also undefeated before the championship, fell in the finals for the second year in a row.

The NCAA's expansion from 56 teams to 64 began in 1998.

Records

The NCAA women's volleyball tournament expanded to 64 teams in 1998, joining the men's and women's basketball tournaments as the only 64-team NCAA Tournaments at the time. The NCAA baseball tournament would expand to the same size in 1999, followed by the NCAA women's soccer tournament in 2001 and the NCAA softball tournament in 2003. The Big Ten and Big 12 each earned six bids in 1998. The Pac-10 only received four bids in the 1998 NCAA Tournament, which is the fewest they have earned in the 64-team era.

Mountain Regional (Long Beach)

East Regional (Gainesville)

Central Regional (University Park)

Pacific Regional (Lincoln)

Final Four – Kohl Center, Madison, Wisconsin

National Semifinals

Long Beach State vs. Florida

Long Beach advanced to the finals easily, taking the 10-0 lead in the opening game before winning 15-2. Florida staved off seven game points in the second game before falling 15-8. Long Beach then won a closer third game to sweep the Gators.

Misty May put down 11 kills and had two service aces, while Jessica Alvarado led the 49ers with 12 kills.

Penn State vs. Nebraska

 
Lauren Cacciamani had 20 kills, Christy Cochran had 19 and the three-time all-American Bonnie Bremner had 13 to help Penn State beat No. 3 Nebraska in four games. The Huskers ended their season 32-2 while Penn State improved to 35-0 and advanced to the program's third title match.

National Championship: Long Beach State vs. Penn State 

Long Beach took the first two games easily, 15-3 and 15-10. However, like the 1997 NCAA championship, Penn State took the next two games to force a fifth game.

In the decisive rally-scoring fifth game, Penn State led 7-2, but Long Beach tied it up at 8. Tied at 12, Long Beach State's Jessica Alvardo put down two kills before Veronica Wall's 19th kill of the night ended the match, 15-12. Long Beach State's Misty May, also the AVCA National Player of the Year, was named the co-MVP of the Championship along with Penn State's Lauren Cacciamani.

NCAA Tournament records

There are two NCAA tournament records that were set in the 1998 tournament.

Service aces, tournament (individual record) - Misty May, Long Beach State - 20 (4 vs. Southern, 4 vs. Arizona, 4 vs. Illinois, 4 vs. Texas, 2 vs. Florida, 2 vs. Penn State)
Service aces, tournament (team record) - Long Beach State - 43 (shared with 2007 Penn State) (15 vs. Southern, 7 vs. Arizona, 8 vs. Illinois, 6 vs. Texas, 4 vs. Florida, 3 vs. Penn State)

References

NCAA Women's Volleyball Championship
NCAA
Sports in Madison, Wisconsin
Volleyball in Wisconsin
1998 in sports in Wisconsin
December 1998 sports events in the United States
Sports competitions in Wisconsin